Epilobium torreyi is a species of flowering plant in the evening primrose family known by the common names Torrey's willowherb and brook spike-primrose. It is native to western North America from British Columbia to California, where it grows in many types of habitat, often in moist areas. It is a hairy annual herb producing a narrow, upright stem often exceeding half a meter tall lined with narrow lance-shaped leaves. The hairy, glandular inflorescence bears tiny white or pink flowers. They are usually cleistogamous, remaining closed and self-pollinating. The fruit is a capsule up to about a centimeter long.

External links
Jepson Manual Treatment
Photo gallery

torreyi